Bùi Quang Huy (born January 5, 1983 in Thái Bình Province is a Vietnamese footballer, playing for club Vicem Hải Phòng as goalkeeper. He was a member of Vietnam national football team.

Career

Club 
Quang Huy came to football about late, not through any formal training. In 1998 (while he was in grade 11), Quang Huy went professional football after joining the youth team of Nam Định. However, with high fitness advantage with skills forged when he was playing at his country helped him to had a position the first-team squads a few months later. Quang Huy is one of the players talented in ages birth in 1980 of Nam Định. In 2005, after with the national team to attend the 2004 Tiger Cup in late last year, Huy was given the armband of Mikado Nam Định, leading players of the next generation stay in V-League in 5 seasons later. Quang Huy signed a term of 3 years with 30 million salaries/month with Xi măng Hải Phòng in pre-season period 2009-10.

National team 
Quang Huy was first called up to Vietnam national football team preparing for 2004 Tiger Cup. In this competition, he was the reserve goalkeeper for Nguyễn Thế Anh. Then, he was called up to Vietnam national football team to preparing 2007 AFC Asian Cup and 2008 AFF Suzuki Cup, but in these two tournament, he was the reserve goalkeeper for Dương Hồng Sơn.

Honours 
Vietnam national football team
2007 ASEAN Football Championship: Third-place
2008 AFF Suzuki Cup: Champion

Mikado Nam Định
2003 V-League: Third-place
2004 V-League: Runner-up
2007 Vietnamese Cup: Champion

Vicem Hải Phòng
2010 V-League: Runner-up

References

External links 
 

1982 births
Living people
Vietnamese footballers
Association football goalkeepers
Vietnam international footballers
2007 AFC Asian Cup players
Footballers at the 2002 Asian Games
Asian Games competitors for Vietnam
Nam Định F.C. players
Vissai Ninh Bình FC players
Haiphong FC players
V.League 1 players
People from Thái Bình province